Elizabeth Joyce Heron (6 November 1916 – 1 April 1980) was a British stage, film and television actress. She was a West End stage star from 1937, and was married to the actor Ralph Michael.

Filmography
 Premiere (1938) - Dancer
 Women Aren't Angels (1943) - Karen
 Twilight Hour (1945) - Diana
 Don Chicago (1945) - Kitty Mannering
 The Agitator (1945) - Helen Montrose
 The Body Said No! (1950) - Journalist
 She Shall Have Murder (1950) - Rosemary Proctor
 The Weak and the Wicked (1954) - Prison Matron Arnold
 Three Cornered Fate (1955) - Edna Hastings
 Beyond This Place (1959) - Lady Catherine Sprott
 A Family at War (1971, TV Series) - Mrs MacKenzie / Mrs. Mackenzie
 Au Pair Girls (1972) - Mrs. Stevenson
 Upstairs, Downstairs (1974, Episodes: "A Patriotic Offering" and "If You Were the Only Girl in the World") - Lady Berkhamstead
 Play for Today: Rumpole and the Confession of Guilt (1975, TV Series) - Hilda Rumpole

References

External links

 

1916 births
1980 deaths
British stage actresses
British film actresses
British television actresses
20th-century British actresses
British expatriates in Egypt